The Kanto Three Great Acalas is a collective term, recorded in the Japanese history, for the three temples that are dedicated to the Acala ("Unmovable Wisdom King") in Kantō region governed by shōgun.

Narita-san Shinsho-ji Temple (成田山新勝寺) and Takahatafudotake Kongo Temple (高幡山金剛寺) had long been considered as two of the three Acala temples down the ages; however, there have been several versions of what the third temple is.

Versions 
Version 1
 Narita-san Shinsho-ji Temple (Narita Acala), Chiba Prefecture
 Takahatafudotake Kongo Temple, (Takahatafudo Acala), Tokyo, Hino
 Gyokusan Sougan Temple (玉嶹山總願寺) (Fudogaoka Acala, 不動ヶ岡不動尊), Saitama Prefecture

Version 2
 Narita-san Shinsho-ji Temple (Narita Acala), Chiba Prefecture
 Takahatafudotake Kongo Temple, (Takahatafudo Acala), Tokyo, Hino
 Aburisan Oyama Temple (雨降山大山寺) (Oyama Acala 大山不動尊), Kanagawa Prefecture

Version 3
 Narita-san Shinsho-ji Temple  (Narita Acala), Chiba Prefecture
 Takahatafudotake Kongo Temple, (Takahatafudo Acala), Tokyo, Hino
 Takayama Fudoson Kokisan JorakuinTemple (高貴山常樂院) (Takayama Acala 高山不動尊), Saitama Prefecture

Version 4
 Narita-san Shinsho-ji Temple (Narita Acala), Chiba Prefecture
 Takahatafudotake Kongo Temple, (Takahatafudo Acala), Tokyo, Hino
 Daisyo Temple (Koshigaya city) (大聖寺 (越谷市)) (Osagami Acala, 大相模不動尊), Saitama Prefecture

See also

References

Shingon Buddhism